The 9th Metro Manila Film Festival was held in 1983. Only eight movies participated.

Cine Suerte's Karnal won the Best Picture and four other awards. The major individual awards, however, was garnered by Lea Productions' Bago Kumalat ang Kamandag including Best Actor and Best Actress for Anthony Alonzo and Coney Reyes respectively, Best Director and Best Screenplay for Willie Milan among others. Other awardees include the films Hot Property and Tengteng de Sarapen.

RVQ Productions' Tengteng de Sarapen was the top grosser of the festival.

Entries

Winners and nominees

Awards
Winners are listed first and highlighted in boldface.

Multiple awards

Controversies
During the awards night, many were surprised after Coney Reyes won the Best Actress award for the movie Bago Kumalat ang Dugo and Anthony Alonzo is given the Best Actor award for the same movie, besting acting greats Charito Solis, Phillip Salvador, and Vic Silayan, who were all in the movie Karnal. In addition, juror's standards of giving Willie Milan the Best Director award against Lino Brocka is questioned.

References

External links

Metro Manila Film Festival
MMFF
MMFF